Philipp Boy (born 23 July 1987 in Schwedt, East Germany) is a former German gymnast.

He was a member of the 2007 and 2010 World bronze medal winning teams. In addition, he won back-to-back silver medals in the World All Around competition (2010 and 2011). He is the 2011 European All Around Champion. In the 2011 World Championships, Boy won the silver all-around because of his high bar routine. He received a score of 16.066, the highest score on high bar by far.

2007

The German men's team won bronze at the World Championships. Boy finished 18th in the individual all-around final.

2008

The German team placed second at the European Championships.

Boy was part of the German Olympic team. He placed 13th in individual all-around finals.

2009

Boy placed fourth in the individual all-around finals at the European Championships.

2010

Boy was part of the team that finished first in the team all-around at the European Championships. He also tied for the bronze medal on high bar with countryman Fabian Hambüchen.

At the World Championships in Rotterdam, the men's team won the bronze medal. Boy won a silver medal in the individual all-around competition. He also qualified to the high bar finals, where he finished fourth.

2011

Boy won the individual all-around title and silver medal in the high bar final at the European Championships.

At the World Championships in Tokyo, the German team placed sixth in the team final. Boy again placed second in the individual all-around behind Kōhei Uchimura. He also qualified for the high bar final, where he placed seventh.

2012

The German team placed sixth at the European Championships. He qualified for the high bar finals and finished eighth.

Boy competed as part of the German Olympic team. The German men's team qualified to finals in fourth place, but placed seventh in the team finals. Boy competed in the qualification for all-around finals and placed 17th, but was prevented from competing in the all-around finals by the two-per-country rule, as Fabian Hambüchen (3rd) and Marcel Nguyen (7th) placed ahead of him.

On 1 December 2012 Boy announced his retirement from competitive sports.

Ninja Warrior

2017 he participated at Ninja Warrior Germany on RTL and failed in the Qualification at the second Obstacle. 2018 he reached Round 2 Semifinalqualification. 2019 he reached the final with his best result so far.

Celebrity Ninja Warrior

He participated 2017, 2018 and 2019 and in all three times he reached the second place.

References

External links 

 
 
 
 

1987 births
Living people
Sportspeople from Schwedt
People from Bezirk Frankfurt 
German male artistic gymnasts
Olympic gymnasts of Germany
Gymnasts at the 2008 Summer Olympics
Gymnasts at the 2012 Summer Olympics
Medalists at the World Artistic Gymnastics Championships
European champions in gymnastics